The Kazim Bulut Mosque is a mosque in Turkey situated in the city of Alanya in the province of Antalya Province.

Buildings and structures in Antalya Province
Mosques in Turkey
Alanya